Sylvia – Eine Klasse für sich was a German family series, which was produced by Sat.1.

Synopsis
The teacher Sylvia Waldmann is a popular teacher at Munich's Franz-Josef-Strauss-school (for the Oskar-von-Miller-Gymnasium is the backdrop). Specifically for this position, she moved to Munich. For the students, she is at school and personal problems, the first point of contact.

Guest Stars 
 Thure Riefenstein
 Heinz Hoenig
 Horst Janson

See also
List of German television series

External links
 

1998 German television series debuts
2000 German television series endings
German-language television shows
Sat.1 original programming
1990s school television series
2000s school television series